Yannick Diekeno Ilunga (born 24 August 1990), known professionally as Petite Noir, is a South African raised, Belgian born, Congolese musician singer, songwriter, musician, and record producer. His debut extended play The King of Anxiety was released in January 2015 and his debut studio album La vie est belle / Life Is Beautiful was released in September of the same year via Domino Records' Double Six Imprint.

Career

2009–12: Popskarr
Petite Noir began his musical career in 2009 with record producer Terrence Pearce as the music duo Popskarr. They have released various singles from 2009 to 2012 and have not released any material together since. Noir's debut solo single "Till We Ghosts" was released in 2012 and was later included on his 2015 debut extended play The King of Anxiety. Also in 2012, Noir released the non-album single "Disappear".

2013–14: Early solo career
In May 2013, English hip hop recording artist Wretch 32 released a Petite Noir remix of his song "Blackout". Noir released another non-album single called "Noirse" in 2013. In November 2013, a remix of "Noirse" was included on the compilation album Saint Heron. In 2014, Noir released a track called "Chess", which would later be included in both his debut extended play The King of Anxiety and his debut studio album La vie est belle / Life Is Beautiful.

2015–present: The King of Anxiety and La vie est belle / Life Is Beautiful
On 19 January 2015, Petite Noir released his debut extended play The King of Anxiety. Pitchfork Media praised the EP as "seamless, subtle and lithe and luminously sexy". It was supported by two singles, "Till We Ghosts" and "Chess".

On 11 September 2015, he released his debut studio album, La vie est belle / Life Is Beautiful It scored a 79 on aggregate review website Metacritic. It was supported by four singles, "Chess", "Down", "Best", and "MDR". In 2015 and 2016, Noir performed live with artists Mac Demarco, Vince Staples, Kendrick Lamar, Killer Mike, and El-P, among others.

In September 2016, Noir was featured on American hip hop recording artist Danny Brown's fourth studio album Atrocity Exhibition on track "Rolling Stone". It was officially released on 27 September, but played on Zane Lowe's Beats 1 radio show on 15 September.

2018 - La Maison Noir / The Black House 
A new track entitled Blame Fire was released in July 2018, ahead of a new album La Maison Noir / The Black House due out on 5 October on Roya records (part of the WARP records group). The new release will be a six track mini-album featuring guest appearances from Danny Brown and Saul Williams.

Discography

Studio albums

Mini-albums

EPs

Singles

As lead artist

Guest appearances

References

External links
 
 

Living people
21st-century Democratic Republic of the Congo singers
Democratic Republic of the Congo rock musicians
Democratic Republic of the Congo electronic musicians
Democratic Republic of the Congo singer-songwriters
art pop musicians
Democratic Republic of the Congo expatriates in Belgium
Democratic Republic of the Congo expatriates in South Africa
1990 births